Santiago de Machaca is a location in the La Paz Department in Bolivia. It is the seat of the Santiago de Machaca Municipality, the first municipal section of the José Manuel Pando Province, and it is also the seat of the province.

References 

Populated places in La Paz Department (Bolivia)